Karolina Olivia Widerström (10 December 1856 – 4 March 1949), was a Swedish doctor and gynecologist. She was the first female physician with a university education in her country. She was also a feminist and a politician, and engaged in the questions of sexual education and female suffrage. She was chairwoman of the National Association for Women's Suffrage and a member of the Stockholm city council.

Biography 

Karolina Widerström was the daughter of the gymnastics teacher and veterinarian Otto Fredrik Widerström and Olivia Erika Dillén. The family moved to Stockholm in 1873. As an adult she lived together with educator and headmistress Maria Aspman (1865-1944).

Education
Women were officially admitted to the universities in Sweden in 1870. Her father wished for her to be a gymnastics teacher like himself. In 1873–1875, Karolina Widerström was a student at the Royal Central Gymnastics Institute, and in 1875–1877, she was the assistant to Professor Branting. She was also active as a physiotherapist. In 1879, she received a degree at Wallinska skolan and in 1880 a degree in medical philosophy at the university at Uppsala. In May 1884, she received a medical degree at the Karolinska Institutet in Stockholm.

Medical career
Widerström wanted women and girls to know more about their own bodies, to dress more healthily, and to receive the same rights and possibilities as men. She was especially active within gynecology and women's health.  Her best-known work within her field was Kvinnohygien ('Women's hygiene'), which was first published in 1899, and reprinted in seven editions until 1932.

Activism

Concerned for women's health issued, she was a strong supporter of the Swedish Dress Reform Association and a vocal force in writing medical articles advocating against tight laced corsets, which at this point in time was a serious health issue.

From about 1900, Widerström was active in the struggle to abolish the so-called reglementation of prostitutes, that is to say the forced registration and regular examination for venereal diseases of prostitutes, a system highly debated among women's rights activists at the time, which organized in the Svenska Federationen to oppose it.

Political engagement
Karolina Widström was elected to the Stockholm city council in 1912 for the liberals, where she served until 1915. She was elected chairwoman of the Swedish Society for Woman Suffrage in 1918, one year before the women suffrage was granted in Sweden in 1919, and became its last chairwoman when she stepped down after the organisation was dissolved in 1921, when the purpose of the organisation was fulfilled and both genders exercised the right to vote in the 1921 election.

See also 
 Charlotte Yhlen, first female Swedish physician who graduated from a university (though in this case, abroad)
 Hedda Andersson, second female physician in Sweden
 Emmy Rappe, first educated Swedish nurse
 Astrid Björkman, Sweden's first female chief physician and hospital manager
 Anna Stecksén, first Swedish woman to defend a doctoral thesis in medicine

References

Sources 
 Lena Hammarberg, Karolina Widerström – sexualreformator och föreningskvinna
 Ny svensk historia: Oscar II och hans tid, 1872–1907, Erik Lindorm 1936 s.231
 Sveriges befolkning 1890, (CD-ROM) Riksarkivet 2003
 Rösträtt, biografier
 Lundberg, Anna (2008). Läkarnas blanka vapen: svensk smittskyddslagstiftning i historiskt perspektiv. Läkarnas blanka vapen: svensk smittskyddslagstiftning i historiskt perspektiv. Sid. 85.

Further reading 
 

1856 births
1949 deaths
Swedish gynaecologists
Women gynaecologists
Swedish suffragists
Swedish women physicians
Local politicians in Sweden
19th-century Swedish physicians
20th-century Swedish physicians
20th-century Swedish women politicians
20th-century women physicians
19th-century women physicians